Jean Le Poulain (12 September 1924 – 1 March 1988) was a French stage actor and stage director.

He attended the cours Simon in Paris and won the first prize of Comedy at the Conservatoire national supérieur d'art dramatique in 1949. He was then recruited by Jean Vilar at the Théâtre national populaire and in 1952 he appeared with Gérard Philipe in The Prince of Homburg by Heinrich von Kleist at the théâtre des Champs-Élysées.
He began as an actor both in theatre and cinema in 1947 and often appeared on the regular theatre show of the French television Au théâtre ce soir created in 1966. 
He joined the Comédie-Française in 1978, where he became sociétaire in 1980, then General administrator from septembre 1986 until his death, where he portrayed Monsieur Jourdain in Le Bourgeois gentilhomme by Molière.

Theatre

Actor 

1947: Un amour comme le nôtre by Guy Verdot, 
1949: L'Habit vert by Gaston Arman de Caillavet and Robert de Flers, directed by Pierre Aldebert, Théâtre national de Chaillot
1949: Le Glorieux by Philippe Néricault Destouches, Théâtre de Chaillot
1950: Barabbas dit de la grotte by Michel de Ghelderode, directed by Jean Le Poulain and Roger Harth, Théâtre de l'Œuvre
1950: L'Amour truqué by Paul Nivoix, directed by Jacques Charon, Théâtre de la Potinière
1951: Halte au destin by Jacques Chabannes, directed by Georges Douking, Théâtre de la Potinière
1951: Mother Courage and Her Children by Bertolt Brecht, directed by Jean Vilar, Théâtre de la Cité Jardins Suresnes
1951: Le Cid by Corneille, directed by Jean Vilar, Théâtre de la Cité Jardins Suresnes 
1952: A Flea in Her Ear by Feydeau, directed by Georges Vitaly, Théâtre Montparnasse
1952: L'Histoire du Docteur Faust by Christopher Marlowe, directed by Jean Le Poulain, Théâtre de l'Œuvre
1952: Robinson by Jules Supervielle, directed by Jean Le Poulain, Théâtre de l'Œuvre
1953: Ces messieurs de la Santé by Paul Armont and Léopold Marchand, Théâtre de Paris
1953: O, mes aïeux !... by José-André Lacour, directed by Jean Le Poulain, Théâtre de l'Œuvre
1954: A Flea in Her Ear by Georges Feydeau, directed by Georges Vitaly, Théâtre des Célestins
1954: Si jamais je te pince !... by Eugène Labiche, directed by Georges Vitaly, Théâtre La Bruyère
1955: Nekrassov by Jean-Paul Sartre, directed by Jean Meyer, Théâtre Antoine 
1955: Anastasia by Marcelle Maurette, directed by Jean Le Poulain, Théâtre Antoine 
1956: Le mari ne compte pas by Roger-Ferdinand, directed by Jacques Morel, Théâtre Édouard VII
1957: Wako, l’abominable homme des neiges by Roger Duchemin, directed by Jean Le Poulain, Théâtre Hébertot
1957: L'École des cocottes by Paul Armont & Marcel Gerbidon, directed by Jacques Charon, Théâtre Hébertot 
1958: Les Pieds au mur by Jean Guitton, directed by Jean de Létraz, Théâtre du Palais-Royal
1958: La Hobereaute by Jacques Audiberti, directed by  Jean Le Poulain, Théâtre du Vieux-Colombier
1959: La Punaise by Vladimir Maïakovski, directed by André Barsacq, Théâtre de l'Atelier
1959: Cyrano de Bergerac by Edmond Rostand, directed by Jean Le Poulain, Théâtre des Célestins, Festival of Bellac
1959: The Trojan War Will Not Take Place by Jean Giraudoux, directed by Jean Marchat, Festival de Bellac
1959: Hamlet by William Shakespeare, directed by Jean Darnel, Arènes de Saintes
1959: Dix Ans ou dix minutes by Grisha Dabat, directed by Jean Le Poulain, Théâtre Hébertot
1960: L'Otage by Paul Claudel, directed by Roger Dornes, Festival de Bellac
1960: De doux dingues by Joseph Carole, directed by Jean Le Poulain, Théâtre Édouard VII
1960: Le Tartuffe by Molière, directed by Jean Le Poulain, Festival de Bellac
1960: Le Tartuffe by Molière, directed by Roland Piétri, Comédie des Champs-Élysées 
1960: Le Songe du critique by Jean Anouilh, directed by the author, Comédie des Champs-Élysées
1961: Twelfth Night by William Shakespeare, directed by Jean Le Poulain, Théâtre du Vieux-Colombier
1961: La Grotte by Jean Anouilh, directed by the author and Roland Piétri, Théâtre Montparnasse 
1962: L'Otage by Paul Claudel, directed by Bernard Jenny, Théâtre du Vieux-Colombier 
1962: Le Pain dur by Paul Claudel, directed by Bernard Jenny, Théâtre du Vieux-Colombier 
1962: Le Père humilié by Paul Claudel, directed by Bernard Jenny, Théâtre du Vieux-Colombier 
1964: Le Minotaure by Marcel Aymé, directed by Jean Le Poulain, Théâtre des Bouffes-Parisiens
1964: Les Escargots meurent debout by Francis Blanche, directed by Jean Le Poulain, Théâtre Fontaine
1964: Moumou by Jean de Letraz, directed by Jean Le Poulain, Théâtre des Bouffes-Parisiens
1965: Les Filles by Jean Marsan, directed by Jean Le Poulain, Théâtre Édouard VII, Théâtre de la Porte-Saint-Martin
1965: Pourquoi pas Vamos by Georges Conchon, directed by Jean Mercure, Théâtre Édouard VII
1965: La Dame de chez Maxim by Georges Feydeau, directed by Jacques Charon, Théâtre du Palais-Royal 
1967: Jean de la Lune by Marcel Achard, directed by Jean Piat, Théâtre du Palais-Royal 
1967: Forbidden to the Public by Jean Marsan, directed by Jean Le Poulain, Théâtre Saint-Georges
1969: Le Bourgeois gentilhomme by Molière, directed by Jean Le Poulain, Festival d'Arles
1969: Interdit au public by Jean Marsan, directed by Jean Le Poulain, Théâtre des Célestins
1969: La Périchole by Jacques Offenbach, directed by Maurice Lehmann, Théâtre de Paris
1969: Le Contrat by Francis Veber, directed by Pierre Mondy, Théâtre du Gymnase
1970: Twelfth Night by William Shakespeare, directed by Jean Meyer, Théâtre antique de Fourvière 
1972: Barbe-Bleue opéra-bouffe by Jacques Offenbach, livret Henri Meilhac and Ludovic Halévy, directed by Maurice Lehmann, Théâtre de Paris
1972: Le Noir te va si bien by Jean Marsan, directed by Jean Le Poulain, Théâtre Antoine
1972: Le Saut du lit by Ray Cooney and John Chapman, Théâtre Montparnasse
1973: Le Bourgeois gentilhomme by Molière, directed by Jean Le Poulain, Théâtre Mogador
1974: Le Bourgeois gentilhomme by Molière, directed by Jean Le Poulain, Mai de Versailles
1975: La Grosse by Charles Laurence, directed by Jean Le Poulain, Théâtre des Bouffes-Parisiens
1976: Volpone by Jules Romains and Stefan Zweig after Ben Jonson, directed by Jean Meyer, Théâtre antique de Fourvière 
1978: Miam miam ou le Dîner d'affaires by Jacques Deval, directed by Jean Le Poulain, Théâtre Marigny
1979: Dave au bord de mer by René Kalisky, directed by Antoine Vitez, Comédie-Française at the Théâtre de l'Odéon
1979: A Flea in Her Ear by Georges Feydeau, directed by Jean-Laurent Cochet, Comédie-Française
1980: Tartuffe by Molière, directed by Jean-Paul Roussillon, Comédie-Française
1980: Le Bourgeois gentilhomme by Molière, directed by Jean-Laurent Cochet, Comédie-Française
1981: La Dame de chez Maxim by Georges Feydeau, directed by Jean-Paul Roussillon, Comédie-Française   
1982: Le Voyage de monsieur Perrichon by Eugène Labiche and Édouard Martin, directed by Jean Le Poulain, Comédie-Française
1982: Yvonne, princesse de Bourgogne by Witold Gombrowicz, directed by Jacques Rosner, Comédie-Française au Théâtre de l'Odéon
1983: L'École des femmes by Molière, directed by Jacques Rosner, Comédie-Française
1987: One for the Road by Harold Pinter, directed by Bernard Murat, Comédie-Française au Festival d'Avignon

Director 

1950: Barabbas by Michel de Ghelderode, directed with Roger Harth, Théâtre de l'Œuvre
1952: L'Histoire du Docteur Faust by Christopher Marlowe, Théâtre de l'Œuvre
1952: Robinson by Jules Supervielle, Théâtre de l'Œuvre
1953: O, mes aïeux !... by José-André Lacour, Théâtre de l'Œuvre
1953: Eté et fumées by Tennessee Williams, Théâtre de l'Œuvre
1953: Le Piège à l'innocent by Eduardo Sola Franco, Théâtre de l'Œuvre
1955: Anastasia by Marcelle Maurette, Théâtre Antoine 
1955: Il y a longtemps que je t'aime by Jacques Deval, Théâtre Édouard VII
1956: La Tour de Nesle by Frédéric Gaillardet after Alexandre Dumas, Théâtre des Mathurins  
1957: Caesar and Cleopatra by George Bernard Shaw, Théâtre Sarah Bernhardt 
1957: Wako, l’abominable homme des neiges by Roger Duchemin, Théâtre Hébertot
1958: La Hobereaute by Jacques Audiberti, Théâtre du Vieux-Colombier
1958: Le Pain des jules by Ange Bastiani, Théâtre des Arts   
1959: Dix Ans ou dix minutes by Grisha Dabat, Théâtre Hébertot
1959: Cyrano de Bergerac by Edmond Rostand, Théâtre des Célestins, Festival de Bellac
1960: L'Apollon de Bellac by Jean Giraudoux, Festival de Bellac 
1960: Supplément au voyage de Cook by Jean Giraudoux, Festival de Bellac
1960: Le Tartuffe by Molière, Festival de Bellac
1960: De doux dingues by Joseph Carole, Théâtre Édouard VII
1961: Twelfth Night by William Shakespeare, Théâtre du Vieux-Colombier
1961: The Respectful Prostitute by Jean-Paul Sartre, Théâtre du Gymnase
1961: Huit Femmes by Robert Thomas, Théâtre Édouard VII, Théâtre des Bouffes-Parisiens en 1962
1961: Coralie et Compagnie by Maurice Hennequin and Albin Valabrègue, Théâtre Sarah Bernhardt  
1962: La Grande Catherine by George Bernard Shaw, Comédie-Française
1962: L'Idée d'Élodie by Michel André, Théâtre Michel
1962: La Contessa ou la Volupté d'être by Maurice Druon, Théâtre de Paris
1963: C'est ça qui m'flanqu'le cafard by Arthur L. Kopit, Théâtre des Bouffes-Parisiens
1964: Le Minotaure by Marcel Aymé, Théâtre des Bouffes-Parisiens
1964: Têtes de rechange by Jean-Victor Pellerin, Théâtre des Bouffes-Parisiens
1964: Moumou by Jean de Letraz, Théâtre des Bouffes-Parisiens
1964: Les Escargots meurent debout by Francis Blanche, Théâtre Fontaine
1964: Quand épousez-vous ma femme ? by Jean Bernard-Luc and Jean-Pierre Conty, Théâtre du Vaudeville
1965: Les Filles by Jean Marsan, Théâtre Édouard VII
1967: Interdit au public by Jean Marsan, Théâtre Saint-Georges
1969: Les Italiens à Paris by Charles Charras and André Gille after Évariste Gherardi, Comédie-Française 
1969: Le Bourgeois gentilhomme by Molière, Festival d'Arles
1972: Huit Femmes by Robert Thomas, Théâtre de la Madeleine
1972: Le Noir te va si bien by Jean Marsan, Théâtre Antoine
1972: Le Saut du lit by Ray Cooney and John Chapman, Théâtre Montparnasse
1973: La Débauche by Marcel Achard, Théâtre de l'Œuvre
1973: Le Bourgeois gentilhomme by Molière, Théâtre Mogador
1975: La Grosse by Charles Laurence, Théâtre des Bouffes-Parisiens
1976: Voyez-vous ce que je vois ? by Ray Cooney and John Chapman, Théâtre de la Michodière
1978: Miam miam ou le Dîner d'affaires by Jacques Deval, Théâtre Marigny
1982: Le Voyage de monsieur Perrichon by Eugène Labiche and Édouard Martin, Comédie-Française  
1988: Le Saut du lit by Ray Cooney and John Chapman, Théâtre des Variétés

Filmography

Cinema 

1948: Les Aventures des Pieds-Nickelés (by Marcel Aboulker)
1959: Le Bossu (by André Hunebelle) - M. de Peyrolles
1961: Le Sahara brûle (by Michel Gast)
1961: Les Livreurs (by Jean Girault) - le professeur Alexis Schmutz
1962: Le Signe du lion (by Éric Rohmer) - le clochard
1962: Arsène Lupin contre Arsène Lupin (by Édouard Molinaro) - le préfet de police
1962: Le Gorille a mordu l'archevêque (by Maurice Labro) - Lahurit
1962: The Mysteries of Paris (by André Hunebelle) - Le maître d'école
1962: L'Empire de la nuit (by Pierre Grimblat)
1963: Le Roi du village (by Henri Gruel)
1964: The Gorillas (by Jean Girault) - le metteur en scène
1966: Le Dix-septième ciel (by Serge Korber)
1968: A Strange Kind of Colonel (by Jean Girault) - Le pasteur
1968: Salut Berthe (by Guy Lefranc) - le père de Berthe
1970: Elle boit pas, elle fume pas, elle drague pas, mais... elle cause ! (by Michel Audiard) - Gruson
1970: Et qu'ça saute (by Guy Lefranc) - Don Pedro
1970: Sortie de secours (by Roger Kahane)
1973: L'Histoire très bonne et très joyeuse de Colinot trousse-chemise (by Nina Companeez) - le frère Albaret
1974: Ursule et Grelu (by Serge Korber) - le docteur du paquebot
1975: L'Ibis rouge (by Jean-Pierre Mocky) - Margos
1975: Divine (by Dominique Delouche) - Bobovitch
1978: Je te tiens, tu me tiens par la barbichette (by Jean Yanne) - Drouillard
1981: Signé Furax (by Marc Simenon) - Klakmuf

Télévision 
1975: Le Tour du monde en quatre-vingts jours - 2 90 minutes parts broadcast on Antenne 2, Monday 29 December and Tuesday 30 December 1975
1979: La Belle vie (by Jean Anouilh, TV director Lazare Iglesis) - Albert
1981: Staline est mort (by Yves Ciampi) - Beria
1983: Le Tartuffe (by Molière, TV director Marlène Bertin) - Tartuffe

Au théâtre ce soir  
Comedian
1966: Interdit au public by Roger Dornès and Jean Marsan, directed by Jean Le Poulain, TV director Pierre Sabbagh, Théâtre Marigny
1968: Azaïs by Georges Berr and Louis Verneuil, directed by Jean Le Poulain, YV director Pierre Sabbagh, Théâtre Marigny
1969: Le Minotaure by Marcel Aymé, directed by Jean Le Poulain, TV director Pierre Sabbagh, Théâtre Marigny
1970: Le Bourgeois gentilhomme by Molière, directed by Jean Le Poulain, TV director Pierre Sabbagh, Théâtre Marigny
1971: Fric-frac by Édouard Bourdet, directed by Jean Le Poulain, TV director Pierre Sabbagh, Théâtre Marigny
1971: De doux dingues by Joseph Carole, directed by Jean Le Poulain, TV director Georges Folgoas, Théâtre Marigny
1973: Twelfth Night by William Shakespeare, directed by Jean Le Poulain, TV director Georges Folgoas, Théâtre Marigny
1975: Le noir te va si bien by Jean Marsan after Saül O'Hara, directed by Jean Le Poulain, TV director Pierre Sabbagh, Théâtre Édouard VII
1977: Le Faiseur by Honoré de Balzac, directed by Pierre Franck, TV director Pierre Sabbagh, Théâtre Marigny
1978: Les Deux Timides and Le Misanthrope et l'Auvergnat by Eugène Labiche and Marc Michel, directed by Jean Le Poulain, TV director Pierre Sabbagh, Théâtre Marigny
1978: Volpone by Jules Romains and Stefan Zweig after Ben Jonson, directed by Jean Meyer, TV directorPierre Sabbagh, Théâtre Marigny 
1978: Miam miam ou le Dîner d'affaires by Jacques Deval, directed by Jean Le Poulain, TV director Pierre Sabbagh, Théâtre Marigny
1984: Le Malade imaginaire by Molière, directed by Jean Le Poulain, TV director Pierre Sabbagh, Théâtre Marigny
Theatre director openly
1972: Le Don d'Adèle by Pierre Barillet and Jean-Pierre Gredy, TV director Pierre Sabbagh Théâtre Marigny
1973: Pétrus by Marcel Achard, TV director Georges Folgoas, Théâtre Marigny

Prizes and honours 
 1978 : prix du Brigadier for Le Faiseur by Honoré de Balzac, Théâtre des Variétés

External links 
 
 J. Le Poulain, interviewé sur son parcours par J.C. Brialy (site de l'INA)

1924 births
1988 deaths
Burials at Montmartre Cemetery
French male stage actors
French theatre directors
Male actors from Marseille
Sociétaires of the Comédie-Française
Administrators of the Comédie-Française
French male film actors
French male television actors
French National Academy of Dramatic Arts alumni
20th-century French male actors